Koshelev is a complex stratovolcano located in the southern part of Kamchatka Peninsula, Russia. It consists of four stratovolcanoes, from which the central Koshelev is the highest.

See also
 List of volcanoes in Russia

References 
 

Mountains of the Kamchatka Peninsula
Volcanoes of the Kamchatka Peninsula
Stratovolcanoes of Russia
Holocene stratovolcanoes